Dushnik is a village in the former municipality of Otllak in Berat County, Albania. At the 2015 local government reform it became part of the municipality Berat.

References

Populated places in Berat
Villages in Berat County